Chida (written:  lit. "thousand ricefield") is a Japanese surname. Notable people with the surname include:

, Japanese footballer
, Japanese fencer
, Japanese rugby union player
, Japanese shogi player
, Japanese aikidoka

Other people
Farhat Chida (born 1982), Tunisian Paralympic athlete

See also

Chica (name)
Chika (general name)

Japanese-language surnames